Van Gorder or VanGorder is a surname. Notable people with the surname include:

Brian VanGorder (born 1959), American football coach
Dave Van Gorder (born 1957), American baseball player
Greenleaf S. Van Gorder (1855–1933), New York politician

Van Gorder is one of several variants of the original surname "Van Garden" adopted by Gysbert Alberts in the 1660s.
Surnames of Dutch origin